Allasani Peddana (అల్లసాని పెద్దన) (15th and 16th centuries CE) was a famous Telugu poet and was ranked as the foremost of the Ashtadiggajalu, the title for the group of eight poets in the court of Emperor Krishnadevaraya, a ruler of the Vijayanagara Empire.

Biography
There were difference of opinions on birth place of

Allasani Peddana..

1.He is the native of Pedda dornala of present prakasam district which is near to Srisailam..

2.Peddana was a native of Somandepalli near Anantapur. He later moved to Peddanapadu, a small village located at 5 km from Yerraguntla on Yerraguntla-Vempalli road in Kadapa District, which is an Agraharam given by Krishnadevarayalu.

He wrote the first major Prabandha, a form of fictional poetry in Telugu, and for this reason, he is revered as Andhra Kavita Pitamahudu (the grand father of Telugu poetry). It is believed that he was also a minister in the king's court and is hence sometimes referred as Peddanaamaatyudu (Sandhi: Peddana + Amaatyudu = Peddana, the minister). He dedicated his works to king Krishnadevarayalu.

Lores
 The emperor himself lifted and bore the weight of the palanquin in which Peddana was seated.
 He was bestowed with Kanakabhishekam by the king.
 He was the only poet who had the privilege of mounting the royal elephants.
 On the demise of  Sri KrishnaDevaRayalu the poet Peddana expressed his profound sorrows telling that " Atti Krishna Rayala thoti divikegaleka brathiki yundithi jeevatchavambu naguchu "
Meaning I became a living dead by not going to heaven along with Sri Krishna Deva Raya .

Works
His famous work was Swaarochisha Manu Sambhavam (also known as Manu Charitramu). This work is the development of an episode in Markandeya-purana relating to the birth of Svarochisha-manu, who
is one of the fourteen Manus. Pravaa, a pious Brahmin youth. goes to the Himalayas for sightseeing. In he Himalayas, a Gandharva woman called Varudhini falls in love with him, but Pravara rejects her love as he is already married. Knowing this, a Gandharva youth who was earlier rejected by Varudhini, assumes the form of Pravara and succeeds to win her love. To the couple is born Svarochi, the father of Svarochisha-manu.

Some of his other famous works such as Harikathaasaaramu are untraceable now.

Krishnadevaraya ornamented Peddana's leg with a big golden bangle/bracelet called ganda-penderam as a mark of excellent poetry

Style
The theme for his Manu Charitra is a short story from Markandeya Purana. It is about second Manu of fourteen manus (fathers of mankind societies according to Hindu mythology), translated into Telugu from Sanskrit by Marana (1291–1323), disciple of Tikkana. The original story was around 150 poems and Peddana extended into six chapters with 600 poems by adding fiction and descriptions.
His work was treated as one of the Pancha Kavyas, the five best works in Telugu. Peddana used a mix of words from Telugu and Sanskrit .

Awards and Titles
 He was honoured with Title Andhra Kavita Pitamaha by Krishnadevaraya.
 His style of poetry was described as 'Allasani Vari Allika Jigi Bigi' by Tenali Ramakrishna

See also
 Srinatha, the first Telugu Prabandha writer.

References

Notes
 A Great Compilation of Telugu poets / poetesses
 Peddana Allasani
 Peddana style
 K.A. Nilakanta Sastry, History of South India, From Prehistoric times to fall of Vijayanagar, 1955, OUP, New Delhi (Reprinted 2002) 
 Golden age of Telugu Literature
 Literary activity in Vijayanagara Empire

Modern editions
 The Story of Manu, by Allasani Peddana, translated by Velcheru Narayana Rao and David Shulman, Murty Classical Library of India, Harvard University Press (January 2015), hardcover, 656 pages, 

Telugu poets
People of the Vijayanagara Empire
Telugu writers
Year of death unknown
Year of birth unknown
Indian male poets
15th-century Indian poets
16th-century Indian poets
Poets from Andhra Pradesh
Vijayanagara poets
Scholars of Vijayanagara Empire